Roger Alfred Nixon (August 8, 1921 – October 13, 2009) was an American composer, musician, and professor of music. He wrote over 60 compositions for orchestra, band, choir and opera. Nixon received multiple awards and honors for his works, many of which contain a feel of the rhythms and dances of the early settlers of his native state of California.

Biography
Nixon was born and raised in California's Central Valley towns of Tulare and Modesto. Nixon attended Modesto Junior College from 1938–1940 where he studied clarinet with Frank Mancini, formerly of John Philip Sousa's band.  He continued his studies at UC Berkeley, majoring in composition and receiving a Bachelor of Arts degree in 1941. His studies were then interrupted by almost four years of active duty in the Navy during World War II, serving as the commanding officer of an LCMR in the Atlantic.

Following the war Nixon returned to UC Berkeley, first receiving a M.A. degree and later a Ph.D.  His primary teacher was Roger Sessions. He also studied with Arthur Bliss, Ernest Bloch, Charles Cushing, and Frederick Jacobi. In the summer of 1948, he studied privately with Arnold Schoenberg.

From 1951 to 1959, Nixon was on the music faculty at Modesto Junior College. He was then appointed to the faculty at San Francisco State College, now San Francisco State University, in 1960 and began a long association with the Symphonic Band, which premiered many of his works.  Most of Nixon's works are for band, but he has also composed for orchestra, chamber ensembles, solo piano, choral ensembles, as well as song cycles and an opera. His most popular and most-performed work is Fiesta del Pacifico, a piece for concert band.

Nixon received several awards including a Phelan Award, the Neil A. Kjos Memorial Award, and five grants from the National Endowment for the Arts. He was elected to the American Bandmasters Association in 1973, the same year he won the association's Ostwald Award for his composition  Festival Fanfare March. In 1997, Nixon was honored by the Texas Bandmasters Association as a Heritage American Composer. At his death, he was Professor Emeritus of Music at San Francisco State University.

His students at San Francisco State University include Kent Nagano.

Nixon died on October 13, 2009, from complications from leukemia at Mills Peninsula Hospital in Burlingame, California.

Selected works
Stage
 The Bride Comes to Yellow Sky, Opera in 4 scenes (1967); libretto by Ray Benedict West, Jr. adapted from the short story by Stephen Crane

Orchestra
 Air for Strings for string orchestra (1948)
 Mooney's Grove Suite (1964, revised 1967)
 Three Dances (1962)
 Overture

Concertante
 Concerto for violin and orchestra (1950s)
 Reflections for flute and band (1965)
 Elegiac Rhapsody for viola and orchestra; initially composed as a separate work, used as movement II of the Viola Concerto
 Concerto for viola and orchestra (1969)
 Two Elegies for solo cello and cello ensemble (1978, 1984)

Concert band
 Music of Appreciation (1944, premiered 1992, published 1994)
 Elegy and Fanfare-March (1958, revised 1967)
 Fiesta del Pacifico (1960)
 Prelude and Fugue (1961)
 San Joaquin Sketches (1962, revised 1982)
 Nocturne (1965)
 Reflections (1965)
 Centennial Fanfare-March (1970); composed for the centennial of the founding of Modesto, California
 A  Solemn Processional (published 1971)
 Festival Fanfare-March (1971); received the 1973 Ostwald Award of the American Bandmasters Association
 Psalm (1972, revised 1979)
 Music for a Civic Celebration (1975)
 Pacific Celebration Suite (1976)
 Chamarita! (1981)
 Academic Tribute (1982, published 1987)
 California Jubilee (1984)
 Arises the New Flower (1985)
 Flower of Youth (1988, published 1992)
 A Centennial Overture (1995)
 A Lyric Remembrance (1997)
 Las Vegas Holiday (2001)
 Monterey Holidays (2001)
 Mondavi Fanfare

Brass
 Ceremonial Fanfare No. 1 for brass (1976)
 Ceremonial Piece for brass (1976, published 1980); composed for Bicentennial of America
 Concert Prelude for brass (1982–1988)

Chamber music
 String Quartet (1949)
 Nocturne for flute and piano (1960)
 Four Duos for flute or oboe (or violin) and clarinet (or viola) (1966)
 Movement for clarinet and piano (1975)
 Variations for bass clarinet (1978)
 Conversations for violin and clarinet (1981)
 Variations for bassoon (1982, published 1983)
 Duo (Dialog) for flute and alto flute (published 1982)
 Two Duos for piccolo and E clarinet (or flute) (published 1982)
 Three Duos for flute and clarinet (1983)
 Music for Clarinet and Piano, 5 Movements (1986)
 Variations for clarinet and cello (1991)

Piano
 Five Piano Preludes (1946)
 Twelve Preludes (1984)
 Music for Piano (1994)
 Twenty-Four Preludes (1946–2000)

Vocal
 Chinese Seasons, Song Cycle for soprano and piano (1942); words from The Hundred Names
 Six Moods of Love, Song Cycle for soprano and piano (1940s?)
     I Am Dark and Fair to See; anonymous words
     I Am in Love with High, Farseeing Places; words by Arthur Davison Ficke
     Grief, Find the Words; words by Philip Sidney
     It Was a Quiet Way; words by Emily Dickinson
     Psalm to My Beloved; words by Eunice Tietjens
     A Decade; words by Amy Lowell
 Gliding o'er All for voice and piano (1972); words by Walt Whitman
 A Narrative of Tides, Song Cycle for mezzo-soprano, flute and piano (1984); words from A Ring of Willows by Eric Barker
 Three Transcendental Songs on Poems by Walt Whitman for mezzo-soprano and piano (1979)

Choral
 Firwood for mixed chorus a cappella (1960); words by John Clare
 Now Living Things for mixed chorus a cappella (1961); words by Leonard Nathan
 The Wind for mixed chorus a cappella (published 1962); words from A Child's Garden of Verses by Robert Louis Stevenson
 Swallows for mixed chorus a cappella (1963); words by Robert Louis Stevenson
 By-By-Baby, Lullay! for mixed chorus a cappella (1965); anonymous words from the 15th century
 Ditty for treble voices (SA) with piano (1966); words from Songs of Travel by Robert Louis Stevenson
 Love's Secret for male chorus a cappella (1967); words by William Blake
 To the Evening Star for mixed chorus a cappella (1967); words by William Blake
 Christmas Perspectives for mixed voices a cappella (1980)
 Festival Mass for mixed chorus and organ (1980)
 Chaunticleer, Motet for male chorus a cappella (1984); words by Geoffrey Chaucer
 From the Canterbury Tales for mixed voices a cappella (1986); words by Geoffrey Chaucer in translation by Anne Worthington Prescott
 Chaucerian Visions for mixed voices and piano (1987); words by Geoffrey Chaucer in translation by Anne Worthington Prescott
 Wonders of Christmas for soloists and mixed chorus a cappella (1993)
     How Great a Mystery; traditional words
     So Gracious Is the Time; words by William Shakespeare
     Green Grow'th the Holly ; anonymous words from the 16th century
     The Star of Christmas Morning; traditional words
     Nativity Morn; words by John Milton
     The Stable; anonymous words
 Our Joyful Feast for mixed chorus a cappella (published 2002); words by George Wither
 The Christmas Tree for mixed chorus a cappella
 Long, Long Ago for mixed chorus a cappella

Further reading
 Anthony Mazzaferro, "Roger A. Nixon and His Works for Band", Journal of Band Research (Fall 1988)

References

Telephone interview of February 20, 1989 by Nicholas Pasquariello

External links
American Bandmaster

Windband
Online Archive of California
Interview with Roger Nixon, January 16, 1988

1921 births
2009 deaths
Deaths from leukemia
Deaths from cancer in California
American male classical composers
American classical composers
University of California, Berkeley alumni
People from Tulare, California
Musicians from Modesto, California
San Francisco State University faculty
United States Navy personnel of World War II
Pupils of Roger Sessions
20th-century classical composers
Modesto Junior College alumni
Pupils of Ernest Bloch
Pupils of Arnold Schoenberg
20th-century American composers
Classical musicians from California
20th-century American male musicians